The Scout and Guide movement in Hungary is served by
 Magyar Cserkészlány Szövetség, member of the World Association of Girl Guides and Girl Scouts
 Magyar Cserkészszövetség, member of the World Organization of the Scout Movement
 Magyarországi Európai Cserkészek, candidate for membership within the Union Internationale des Guides et Scouts d'Europe
  Magyar Öregcserkész Klub, member of the International Scout and Guide Fellowship

International Forum of Hungarian Scouting
The International Forum of Hungarian Scouting is a union of Hungarian Scouting organizations in Hungary as well as abroad. Its members are:
 Magyar Cserkészlány Szövetség
 Magyar Cserkészszövetség
 Külföldi Magyar Cserkészszövetség (Hungarian Scout Association in Exteris), a Scouts-in-Exile organization.
 five minority organizations in the adjacent countries:
 Croatia: Horvátországi Magyar Cserkészszövetség (HZMCSSZ)
 Romania: Romániai Magyar Cserkészszövetség (RMCSSZ)
 Vojvodina (Serbia): Vajdasági Magyar Cserkészszövetség (VMCSSZ)
 Slovakia: Szlovákiai Magyar Cserkészszövetség (SZMCSSZ)
 Ukraine: Kárpátaljai Magyar Cserkészszövetség (KáMCSSZ)

International Scouting units in Hungary
In addition, there are USA Girl Scouts Overseas in Budapest, serviced by way of USAGSO headquarters in New York City; as well as Cub Scouts and Boy Scouts linked to the Horizon District of the Transatlantic Council of the Boy Scouts of America, which supports units in west-and-central Europe, the Near East and North Africa.

See also

 White Stag Leadership Development Program

External links
 International Forum of Hungarian Scouting
 Vajdasági Magyar Cserkészszövetség (Vojvodina)